Minuscule 478 (in the Gregory-Aland numbering), α 1126 (in the Soden numbering), is a Greek minuscule manuscript of the New Testament, on parchment. Palaeographically it has been assigned to the 10th century. Scrivener labeled it by number 575. It has complex context and full marginalia.

Description 

The codex contains a complete text of the four Gospels on 268 parchment leaves (size ), without any lacunae. The text is written in one column per page, 26 lines per page.

There is also a division according to the smaller Ammonian Sections, with references to the Eusebian Canons (written below Ammonian Section numbers).

The manuscript is elegantly and correctly written.
It contains the pericope John 7:53-8:11 but marked with an obelus.

Text 

The Greek text of the codex is a representative of the Byzantine text-type. Aland placed it in Category V.

According to the Claremont Profile Method it represents textual family Kx in Luke 1, Luke 10, and Luke 20.

In Matthew 1:11, it reads Ιωσιας δε εγεννησεν τον Ιωακειμ, Ιωακειμ δε εγεννησεν τον Ιεχονιαν instead of Ιωσιας δε εγεννησεν τον Ιεχονιαν. The reading is supported by Codex Campianus, Codex Koridethi, Σ, f1, 33, 258, 661, 791, 954, 1216, 1230, 1354, 1604, ℓ 54.

History 

Currently the manuscript is dated by the INTF to the 10th century.

The manuscript once belonged to Bishop of Caesarea Palaestina. It was purchased by the British Museum from R. H. Evans, 24 January 1838, lot 23. According to the 1838 sale catalogue, it was "procured from the Library of the Bishop of Philippi at the foot of Mount Lebanon".

The manuscript was examined and collated by Scrivener, who published its text in 1852. The manuscript was added to the list of New Testament manuscripts by Scrivener (575) and Gregory (478). It was re-examined by Bloomfield. C. R. Gregory saw it in 1883.

It is currently housed at the British Library (Add MS 11300) in London.

See also 

 List of New Testament minuscules
 Biblical manuscript
 Textual criticism

References

Further reading 

  (as k)
 S. T. Bloomfield, Catalogue of ancient Manuscripts in the British Museum (London 1881), Plate 16.
 E. M. Thompson, An Introduction to Greek and Latin Palaeography (Oxford, 1912), p. 226.

External links 
 Minuscule 478 at the British Library

Greek New Testament minuscules
10th-century biblical manuscripts
British Library additional manuscripts